Marvin M. "Vinny" Giles III (born January 4, 1943) is an American amateur golfer. He is best known for winning both the U.S. Amateur and the British Amateur.

Giles was born in Lynchburg, Virginia. He graduated from the University of Georgia in 1966, where he was a three-time All-American on the golf team. He also graduated from the University of Virginia Law School in 1969.

Giles finished second in the U.S. Amateur three straight years, 1967 to 1969, before finally winning in 1972. This was in the stroke play era. His victory in the British Amateur came in 1975. He won numerous other amateur tournaments, including seven Virginia State Amateurs, as well as three Virginia Open titles.

Giles played on four Walker Cup teams (1969, 1971, 1973, 1975), winning three times, and captained the 1993 team to victory. He also played on three winning Eisenhower Trophy teams (1968, 1970, 1972) and captained the 1992 team to a runner-up finish.

Giles played in 11 professional majors, making the cut in three of nine Masters Tournament appearances and in both U.S. Open appearances. He was low amateur in the 1968 Masters Tournament (tied for 22nd) and in the 1973 U.S. Open (17th). He was also low amateur in three U.S. Senior Opens (1993, 1996, 1997)

Giles served on the Executive Committee of the Virginia State Golf Association for over 20 years, and then was first an Associate Director and then a Director of the Southern Golf Association for three years.

Giles was inducted into the Virginia Sports Hall of Fame in 1976 and the Southern Golf Association Hall of Fame in 1984.

Giles is owner and president of a golf management firm which represents such golfers as Tom Kite, Davis Love III, Lanny Wadkins, Beth Daniel, and Meg Mallon. He lives in Richmond, Virginia.

Tournament wins
1962 Virginia State Amateur
1963 Dogwood Invitational
1964 Virginia State Amateur
1965 Dogwood Invitational
1966 Virginia State Amateur
1967 Southern Amateur
1968 Virginia State Amateur
1969 Virginia State Amateur, Virginia Open
1971 Northeast Amateur, Virginia State Amateur
1972 U.S. Amateur
1973 Porter Cup, Eastern Amateur
1974 Virginia Open
1975 British Amateur, Southern Amateur
1987 Virginia State Amateur
1990 Crump Cup
1993 Virginia Open

Senior amateur wins
2000 Virginia State Senior Amateur
2002 Society of Seniors Dale Morey, George Coleman Invitational Senior, David A. King Senior Legends Invitational, Senior Hall of Fame
2007 Crump Cup Senior
2009 U.S. Senior Amateur
2010 Crump Cup Senior
2000,2001,2005,2008,2009 U.S.S.G.A. Champion

Results in major championships

Note: Giles never played in The Open Championship or PGA Championship

LA = Low amateur
CUT = missed the half way cut
"T" indicates a tie for a place.

U.S. national team appearances
Amateur
Walker Cup: 1969 (winners), 1971, 1973 (winners), 1975 (winners), 1993 (winners, non-playing captain)
Eisenhower Trophy: 1968 (team winners and individual leader, tie), 1970 (winners), 1972 (winners)
Americas Cup: 1967 (winners)

References

External links
2004 U.S. Senior Open profile
Amateur Golf Report profile
Virginia State Golf Association profile

American male golfers
Amateur golfers
Georgia Bulldogs men's golfers
Golf administrators
Golfers from Virginia
Sportspeople from Lynchburg, Virginia
Sportspeople from Richmond, Virginia
1943 births
Living people